Jean Le Lan (10 January 1937 – 1 January 2017) was a French racing cyclist. He rode in the 1962 Tour de France.

References

1937 births
2017 deaths
French male cyclists
Place of birth missing